Loot and Other Stories is set of ten short stories by the South African writer Nadine Gordimer, published in 2003.

Stories
"Loot"
"Mission Statement"
"Visiting George"
"The Generation Gap"
"L,U,C,I,E."
"Look-alikes"
"The Diamond Mine"
"Homage"
"An Emissary"
"Karma"

External links
New York Times review
Review from The Guardian
Review from The Independent

2003 short story collections
Short story collections by Nadine Gordimer
Jonathan Cape books
South African short story collections